Zola is an online wedding registry, wedding planner, and retailer. It is a female-led e-commerce company that allows couples to register for gifts, experiences, and cash funds as well as add gifts from other stores. Zola has also expanded into wedding planning with free wedding websites, invitations, and items for the wedding day. There is no cost or fee to register with Zola, with the company generating revenue by selling wedding gifts and wedding-related items.

History
Zola was founded in New York City in 2013 by Shan-Lyn Ma and Nobu Nakaguchi. It was launched as an online wedding registry which for the first time allowed couples to register for gifts, experiences, and cash funds as well as add gifts from other stores, all in one place. The registry allows couples to choose when their gifts ship and exchange gifts digitally before they ship.

The company has received $140 million in funding, the most recent being $100 million in 2018.

In 2017, Zola expanded from being a wedding registry to also offering wedding planning services through Zola Weddings. The free service includes wedding websites, guest lists, RSVP tracking, and customizable checklists. The company introduced customized wedding invitations and save the dates in 2018 from investors including Comcast and Goldman Sachs.

In October 2018, home decor retailer Crate & Barrel and Zola initiated a partnership which allows Zola users to register for more than 3,500 Crate & Barrel products.

In January 2019, Zola opened its first brick-and-mortar location, a pop-up shop in the Flatiron District of New York City.

With a valuation of $600 million as of February 2019, Zola is on the path to being a unicorn (a privately held startup company valued at over $1 billion). According to The New York Times, "Zola is one of three companies on the list of [50] potential next unicorns that have been fueled by millennials' spending."

Services

Registry 
Business Insider cited several pros of the Zola registry, including the ability to aggregate gifts from multiple websites, a clean user interface, the ability to select delivery time and location for each gift, simple logging of thank you cards, experiential gifts like AirBnB, and group gifting. However, they cite a lack of physical retail space and shipping costs for large gifts amongst the challenging of using the Zola Registry.

In addition to traditional gift registry options, Zola has a feature for cash giving that allows users to set up funds of their choice.

In 2019, Vox.com wrote, "Registries may be adapting, but there’s no indication that they’re going anywhere..." citing Zola as a major source of change in the wedding registry space.

Paper Goods 
In 2020, Zola added the option to send Change the Dates to guests, due to  the COVID-19 pandemic.

Other Services 

 Wedding Website
 Guest List Planning
 Wedding Attire
 Decor & Favors
 Hotel Blocks
 Wedding Vendors

Controversy
In early December 2019, Zola was among several wedding planning sites who announced they would remove from their listings wedding locations that once were slave plantations.  The move was a response to the civil rights advocacy group Color of Change, who contend that the use and marketing of plantations, namely those in the Antebellum South, as venues for weddings hides their history as sites of slave labor.  Though Zola initially indicated that Color of Change's concerns didn't violate their anti-discrimination policies, the company indicated they would work with the organization to ensure their policies promote inclusiveness.

Later in December 2019, a Zola advertising campaign was the subject of controversy due to its airing on, and being pulled from air by, Hallmark Channel. The six-ad series featured couples of various assortments at the altar voicing vow-like regrets about not using Zola to plan their nuptials. One of the couples featured was a lesbian couple that appeared in three of the ads briefly and one 30-second spot exclusively (they are shown kissing at the altar in the latter). That couple's inclusion raised the ire of One Million Moms, with the conservative group urging Hallmark Channel to reconsider "airing commercials with same-sex couples." Hallmark Channel's parent, Crown Media Family Networks, obliged and announced on December 13 they would pull from air the four Zola ads that featured the couple, citing network policy that forbids its airing of controversial content, namely the women kissing. After being roundly criticized by LGBTQ figures, allies, and rights groups (GLAAD president Sara Kate Ellis called the move "discriminatory"), Crown Media reversed course on December 15 and reinstated the pulled ads. In response, Zola, who had severed ties with Hallmark Channel, announced they would reach out to the network to consider further advertising.

References

External links

Wedding industry
Retail companies established in 2013
Internet properties established in 2013
Companies based in New York City
American companies established in 2013
2013 establishments in New York (state)